Listen to the Music: The Very Best of the Doobie Brothers is a compilation album by American rock band the Doobie Brothers, released in 1993. The album has 19 tracks, including a remix version of "Long Train Runnin'". The album reached at number 10 on the ARIA Charts and also peaked at number 19 on the Official New Zealand Music Chart.

Reception 

Stephen Thomas Erlewine from AllMusic wrote: "Until the release of Rhino's 2001 collection, [this] was the most comprehensive Doobie Brothers overview on the market." He called it "a good collection" but the Rhino collection "is cheaper and easier to find".

Track listing

Personnel 
 Tom Johnston – lead and backing vocals, guitars, harmonica
 Patrick Simmons – lead and backing vocals, guitars, banjo
 Michael McDonald – lead and backing vocals, keyboards, synthesizers
 John McFee – backing vocals, guitars
 John Hartman – drums, percussion
 Michael Hossack – drums, percussion
 Tiran Porter – backing vocals, bass
 Keith Knudsen – backing vocals, drums, percussion
 Jeff "Skunk" Baxter – guitars
 Bobby LaKind – backing vocals, congas, bongos
 Chet McCracken – drums, percussion 
 Cornelius Bumpus – backing vocals, saxophones, organ

Charts

Weekly charts

Year-end charts

Certifications

References 

1993 greatest hits albums
The Doobie Brothers compilation albums
Warner Records compilation albums
Warner Music Group compilation albums
Albums produced by Ted Templeman
Albums produced by Rodney Mills